

Career
Cory Johnson is the founder and CEO of the Business Podcast Network and hosts the daily Drill Down podcast. Previously he served as Chief Market Strategist for Ripple, a digital payments solution company that utilizes blockchain technology. He was the first Silicon Valley correspondent for CNBC business news and co-host of Bloomberg West with Emily Chang where they discussed the tech sector. Johnson also covered internet companies, social media, cloud computing, and various other developments in technology, media, and entertainment. He also hosted "Bloomberg Markets" on radio, alongside Carol Massar. Johnson is also a member of Investigative Reporters and Editors.

He sits on the board of the Rochester YMCA's Camp Cory, which he attended in his youth.

Education
Johnson grew up in Rochester, New York.

He attended New York University where he received his undergraduate degree.

Honors and awards
Johnson was featured in Houghton Mifflin's The Best American Sportswriters.

References

External links
Bloomberg bio

1966 births
Living people
American male journalists
American television reporters and correspondents
American magazine editors
New York University alumni
CNBC people
Bloomberg L.P. people
20th-century American journalists